Field hockey at the 2013 East Asian Games in Tianjin took place from 6 to 13 October at the Tianjin Olympic Center.

Competition schedule
The men's and women's tournaments were held simultaneously. The schedule was as follows:

Teams
In addition to the host nation, China, three teams competed in both the men's and women's tournaments. The participating nations are as follows.

Men's competition

The competition consisted of two stages; a group stage followed by classification matches.

Group stage
The four nations competed in a single round-robin format to determine group standings.

Classification matches

Bronze-medal match

Gold-medal match

Women's competition

The competition consisted of two stages; a group stage followed by classification matches.

Group stage
The four nations competed in a single round-robin format to determine group standings.

Classification matches

Bronze-medal match

Gold-medal match

Medal summary

Medal table

References

External links
 Official Site

 
East Asian Games
2013 East Asian Games
Events at the 2013 East Asian Games
2013